Noah Fleiss (born April 16, 1984) is an American actor. He began his career as a child actor, making his film debut as the eponymous Sam Whitney in Josh and S.A.M. (1993). Subsequently, he played the title character in Joe the King (1999) and appeared in Brick (2005). Outside of his film roles, Fleiss portrayed one of the eight playable characters in the video game Until Dawn (2015).

Born in White Plains, New York, Fleiss' great uncle is Professor Joseph L. Fleiss, and he is a distant relative of Dr. Paul Fleiss, Mike Fleiss, and Heidi Fleiss.

Career

Fleiss made his screen debut as a young runaway (Sam Whitney) who drives cross-country with his brother in Josh and S.A.M. (1993), perhaps his best-known film. He also has appeared in films such as Joe the King (1999), The Laramie Project (2002), and Brick (2005), in which he portrayed the intimidating Tug. Television appearances include Touched by an Angel, Law & Order, Law & Order: Special Victims Unit, and Fringe.

In 1996, Fleiss was awarded The Hollywood Reporters YoungStar Award for Best Performance by a Young Actor in a TV Movie or Miniseries for his performance in A Mother's Prayer opposite Linda Hamilton. He was named Jane magazine's "Star of Tomorrow" in 2002 and Nylon magazine's "Next Ed Norton".

Filmography

Film

Television

Video games

Music videos

References

External links

1984 births
Living people
American male film actors
American male television actors
American male child actors
American male video game actors
Male actors from New York (state)
People from White Plains, New York
20th-century American male actors
21st-century American male actors